Nicholas John Kemp (born 16 December 1956) is an English businessman and former professional cricketer. 

Kemp was born at Bromley in Greater London and educated at Tonbridge School. He first played for Kent County Cricket Club's Second XI in 1974 before touring the West Indies with a Young England side in 1976 before making his first-class cricket debut for Kent in May 1977 against the touring Australians.

Kemp made a total of 13 first-class appearances for the Kent First XI as well as playing eight times in limited overs cricket for the county between 1977 and 1981, primarily as a bowling all-rounder. He moved to Middlesex in 1982, making a further five first-class and one limited overs appearances. In his 18 first-class matches he took only 16 wickets, six of which came in one match against Surrey in 1980. 

After leaving Middlesex, Kemp developed a finial services career in wealth management, going on to found and manage Stoneford Administration Services, a financial services company. His son, Ben, was a member of Kent's Cricket Academy for young players before progressing to play a number of matches for the county Second XI and three first-class matches for the Oxford MCC University side.

References

External links

1956 births
Living people
People educated at Tonbridge School
English cricketers
Kent cricketers
Middlesex cricketers
People from Bromley